The Man with the Frog (German: Der Mann mit dem Laubfrosch) is a 1929 German silent crime film directed by Gerhard Lamprecht and starring Heinrich George, Hans Junkermann and Evelyn Holt. The film's art direction was by Otto Moldenhauer.

Cast

References

Bibliography
 Caneppele, Paolo. Entscheidungen der Wiener Filmzensur: 1929-1933. Film-Archiv Austria, 2003.

External links

1929 films
Films of the Weimar Republic
1929 crime films
German crime films
German silent feature films
Films directed by Gerhard Lamprecht
National Film films
German black-and-white films
1920s German films
1920s German-language films